George Nurse may refer to:
 George Nurse (VC)
 George Nurse (footballer)